The Flathead National Forest is a national forest in the western part of the U.S. state of Montana. The forest lies primarily in Flathead County, south of Glacier National Park. It is named after the Flathead Native Americans who live in the area.

Description
The forest lies primarily in Flathead County (about 73% of its acreage), but smaller areas extend into five other counties. In descending order of land area they are Powell, Missoula, Lake, Lewis and Clark, and Lincoln counties. Forest headquarters are located in Kalispell, Montana. There are local ranger district offices in Bigfork, Hungry Horse, and Whitefish.

The Flathead National Forest is bordered by Glacier National Park and Canada to the north, the Lewis and Clark National Forest and Glacier to the east, the Lolo National Forest to the south, and the Kootenai National Forest to the west. The wilderness areas in the forest are the Bob Marshall Wilderness Area, Great Bear Wilderness Area, and Mission Mountains Wilderness Area. Other specially-designated areas in the forest include Flathead Wild and Scenic River, Jewel Basin Hiking Area, and the Coram Experimental Forest. Some  of non-federal land are also included in the boundaries drawn for the national forest. This includes private land, commercial forest and part or all of Swan River State Forest, Stillwater State Forest and Coal Creek State Forest.

Approximately  of the Pacific Northwest National Scenic Trail are located within the Flathead National Forest.

Ecology
The forest provides habitat for approximately 250 species of wildlife and 22 species of fish. This includes bald eagle, wolverine, beaver, elk, porcupine, cougar, moose, bobcat,
white-tailed deer, coyote, grizzly bear, timber wolf, two species of fox, mountain goat, Canadian lynx, woodchuck, bighorn sheep and bull trout.

Activities
Commercial activities in the non-wilderness sections of the forest include timber harvesting, two downhill ski resorts and a small amount of cattle grazing. Larger amounts of berries, firewood and Christmas tree cutting, and mushroom or mineral gathering in wilderness areas require permits.

While camping is allowed almost anywhere within national forests without a permit, Flathead National Forest also has 31 campgrounds with some facilities. The largest campground has only 40 sites and 2 campgrounds have only one site each. Most campgrounds do not have running water. There are also 14 cabins for rent in the forest.

Points of interest 

Whitefish Mountain Resort is a ski resort located on Big Mountain in the Flathead National Forest.
 Big Creek Ranger Station is listed on the National Register of Historic Places.
Coram Experimental Forest is an  experimental western larch forest located in the Flathead National Forest.

See also
 List of forests in Montana

References

External links 

 Official website
 Pacific Northwest Trail

 
National Forests of Montana
National Forests of the Rocky Mountains
Protected areas established in 1897
Protected areas of Flathead County, Montana
Protected areas of Powell County, Montana
Protected areas of Missoula County, Montana
Protected areas of Lake County, Montana
Protected areas of Lewis and Clark County, Montana
Protected areas of Lincoln County, Montana
1897 establishments in Montana